Ansonia is a genus of true toads found in south India, northern Thailand, Malay Peninsula, Tioman Island, Borneo, and Mindanao (Philippines). These small forest species spawn in streams and have torrent-adapted tadpoles. Common name stream toads has been coined for the genus, although individual species are also being referred to as slender toads.

The genus was named by Stoliczka after the governor of Penang, Colonel Edward Anson.

Species
There are currently over 34 species in this genus:

References

External links
  taxon Ansonia at http://www.eol.org.
  Taxon Ansonia at https://web.archive.org/web/20160606043808/http://www.itis.gov/index.html. (Accessed: Apr 30, 2008).
  Taxon Ansonia at https://web.archive.org/web/20080501142231/http://data.gbif.org/welcome.htm

 
Amphibian genera
Frogs of Asia
Taxa named by Ferdinand Stoliczka